are private Japanese Buddhist schools located in Kobe, Japan. In 2002 the schools took on their current name and both boys and girls were allowed to matriculate for the first time. The school uniform was also changed to the COMME CA DU MODE  School Label.

History 
1921 Seitoku Women's Practical School is established in a location other than the current one.
1924 Name changed to Kobe Seitoku Women's High School.
1926 Moved to the current location in Chuo-ku, Kobe.
1948 A new school government is established and the name is changed to Seitoku Gakuen Junior High School & Seitoku Gakuen High School, respectively.
1983 General English Course is established.
1990 General Arts & Sciences Course is established.
2002 Both boys and girls are allowed to matriculate. School name is changed to Kobe Ryūkoku. Special Arts & Sciences Course is established.
2003 Both boys and girls are allowed to apply for the Special English Course.
2006 Special Arts & Sciences S Course is established.

Subjects 
Daily Curriculum
General College Preparatory Comprehensive Course (girls only)
General Special Arts & Sciences Course
General Special Arts & Sciences S Course
General Special English Course

External links 
Kobe Ryūkoku High School  the  section was used for reference

Private schools in Japan
Buddhist schools in Japan
High schools in Hyōgo Prefecture
Junior high schools in Japan
Educational institutions established in 1921
Education in Kobe
Schools in Hyōgo Prefecture
Buildings and structures in Kobe
1921 establishments in Japan